China Candid: The People on the People's Republic (University of California Press, 2006) is a book written by Chinese journalist Sang Ye.

It is the second book of interviews Sang has been involved in, following co-authorship with Zhang Xinxin on Chinese Profiles (Beijing 1986), revised as Chinese Lives (1988).

The author interviewed thirty-six citizens of the People's Republic of China; each chapter of the book is a transcript of each interview turned into a single narrative flow, as if the interviewed person is talking alone during the whole interview, without interruptions from the journalist.

Some people the author has interviewed are:
 a new tycoon
 a worker coming to Beijing from the countryside
 a young athlete
 the founder of a private orphanage
 a prostitute
 a computer hacker

It was translated into Italian in 2007.

References

External links
 Publisher site
 Amazon

2006 non-fiction books
University of California Press books
Oral history
Books about China
Books of interviews